Events from the year 1676 in Sweden

Incumbents
 Monarch – Charles XI

Events

 1 June - Danish victory in the Battle of Öland and Danish invasion of the Swedish province of Scania.
 Creation of the Snapphane movement to resist the Swedes in the province of Scania.
 Battle of Bysjön
 August 17 - Swedish victory in the Battle of Halmstad
 December 4 - Swedish victory in the Battle of Lund
 Åbo landtag

Births

 Nils Reuterholm, governor (died 1756) 
 Philip Johan von Strahlenberg, officer and geographer   (died 1747)

Deaths
 29 April - Anna Zippel, alleged witch  (born date unknown) 
 29 April - Brita Zippel, alleged witch (born date unknown) 
 1 June - Lorentz Creutz, government administrator, county governor  (born 1615)
 June - Claes Uggla, officer (born 1614) 
 July - Carl Gustaf Wrangel, commander (born 1613)  
 August - Lars Stigzelius, archbishop (born 1598) 
 5 August - Malin Matsdotter, alleged witch  (born 1613) 
 November - Gävle Boy, notorious witch finder  (born 1663)

References

 
Years of the 17th century in Sweden
Sweden